A Montessori school uses a teaching method encouraging autodidacticism.

Montessori school may also refer to:

 One of the list of Montessori schools
 Montessori School station, a former railroad stop in Buckingham Township, Pennsylvania

See also 
 Montessori (disambiguation)